Kempten is a town in Bavaria, Germany.

Kempten may also refer to:
 Kempten, Switzerland, a village in Wetzikon, Zürich, Switzerland
 Free Imperial City of Kempten, a free city in the Holy Roman Empire
 Kempten am Rhein, a district of Bingen am Rhein

See also
 Kempten railway station (disambiguation) 
 Kempton (disambiguation)
 Kempten Abbey, an abbey and state of the Holy Roman Empire